Integrated Systems Inc. (ISI) was an embedded software company founded by Naren Gupta in 1980/1981. Summit Partners invested in 1987, the company listed in 1990, and it was acquired by Wind River Systems in 2000.

Naren Gupta served as President/CEO of ISI until 1994, and as its chairman until the company was bought by their competitor Wind River Systems in February 2000. Later he served as vice-chairman and CEO of Wind River Systems.

Products
The company's main products were:

 MATRIXx, introduced in 1983, a control engineering (computer aided control system design or CACSD) tool with components including XMath (an extended MATLAB-like language) and SystemBuilder for graphical editing of block diagrams. After the merger with Wind River the product was licensed to MathWorks, but after an anti-trust action, it was sold to National Instruments. In 2018, National Instruments placed MATRIXx into a five-year end-of-life phase, with no further support beyond 30 June 2023.
 pSOS, a real-time operating system for the Motorola 68000 microprocessor family acquired from Software Components Group (SCG) for  million in 1991.
 FlexOS, a continuation of Digital Research's Concurrent DOS 286 and Concurrent DOS 68K, a modular multiuser multitasking real-time operating system (RTOS) for Motorola 68000 as well as for Intel 186, 286 and 386 microprocessors designed for computer-integrated manufacturing, laboratory, retail and financial markets; acquired from Novell for  million in July 1994. The deal comprised a direct payment of half this sum, and shares representing 2% of the company.

References

Further reading

External links
 

1981 establishments in California
2000 disestablishments in California
2000 mergers and acquisitions
Defunct software companies of the United States
Software companies based in the San Francisco Bay Area
Software companies established in 1981
Software companies disestablished in 2000